Stone Oak is a master planned district in north central San Antonio, Texas, United States. It is located north of Loop 1604 and west of U.S. 281. The district has many gated communities with 24-hour security, well-landscaped medians, granite rock formations, and oak tree wooded areas. Stone Oak and its outlying neighborhoods have a combined population of 81,110 people as of 2020.

Demographics
, the population of Stone Oak is estimated to be 81,110 and has only increased in the last few years with new neighborhoods popping up almost monthly.

Politically, Stone Oak leans conservative and voted for Donald Trump in both 2016 and 2020. Stone Oak also has one of the 2 Conservative city council districts in San Antonio.

Stone Oak is also home to Canyon Springs Golf Club and the Club at Sonterra golf and country clubs.

Schools and education
Neighborhoods in Stone Oak south of Overlook Drive are served by North East Independent School District, while some north of Overlook Drive are served by Comal Independent School District.

References

Neighborhoods in San Antonio